Emmanuel Edosa Iyoha (born 11 October 1997) is a German professional footballer who plays as a forward for Fortuna Düsseldorf.

References

External links

Living people
1997 births
German sportspeople of Nigerian descent
Footballers from Düsseldorf
Association football forwards
German footballers
Germany youth international footballers
Germany under-21 international footballers
Fortuna Düsseldorf players
Fortuna Düsseldorf II players
VfL Osnabrück players
FC Erzgebirge Aue players
Holstein Kiel players
2. Bundesliga players
3. Liga players